The  (TOCOG) was the organisation responsible for overseeing the planning and development of the 2020 Summer Olympic and Paralympic Games.

History
The Organising Committee was launched on 24 January 2014, and is composed of members of the Japanese Olympic Committee, the Japanese Paralympic Committee, the Tokyo Metropolitan Government, the Japanese government, as well as members of various other organisations and individuals from various fields. It was spearheaded by former Prime Minister Yoshirō Mori until his resignation in 2021, with Toshirō Mutō as Director General (CEO) and former Prime Minister Shinzō Abe as its Supreme Advisor.

Mori offered his resignation as head of the committee on 12 February 2021 following remarks he made during a meeting the previous week that were regarded as sexist. On 18 February, seven-time Olympian and LDP lawmaker Seiko Hashimoto was introduced as the committee's new president. Hashimoto is the first woman to head the TOCOG and second woman to lead the Olympic Committee after Athens 2004 Olympic Committee chairperson Gianna Angelopoulos-Daskalaki. 

Prior to assuming the post of committee president, Hashimoto served on the Japanese Cabinet as Minister of State for the Tokyo Olympic and Paralympic Games. LDP lawmaker Tamayo Marukawa was selected to succeed Hashimoto in the Cabinet role.

The committee dissolved in June 2022.

See also

 Concerns and controversies at the 2020 Summer Olympics about TOCOG bribery and corruption concerns

References

External links
 

2020 Summer Olympics
2020 Summer Paralympics
Organising Committees for the Olympic Games
Organising Committees for the Paralympic Games
2014 establishments in Japan